Akbar Khan Zand was an Iranian prince from the Zand dynasty, who played a lively and vicious role in the fratricidal power conflict that took place after the death of Karim Khan Zand in 1779.

Sources 
 
 
 
 
 

18th-century Iranian politicians
18th-century births

1782 deaths

Year of birth unknown
Zand dynasty
Zand governors of Shiraz
Zand generals